Pietkowo  is a village in the administrative district of Gmina Poświętne, within Białystok County, Podlaskie Voivodeship, in north-eastern Poland.

The village has a population of 320.

References

Pietkowo